Andres Raja (born 2 June 1982) is a retired Estonian decathlete.

Raja was born in Leningrad. He finished sixteenth at the 2007 World Championships and sixth at the 2008 World Indoor Championships.

He set a personal best score of 8119 points in August at 2009 World Championships in Athletics. His second best result is 8118 achieved in August 2008 at the Olympics after qualifying to the games with personal best 8069 points, achieved in July 2008 in Rakvere.

Raja finished tenth at the 2010 European Championships in Barcelona with 7991 points. He was second in the heptathlon at the Tallinn International meet, scoring a personal best of 6114 points, while winner Ashton Eaton broke the world record.

Achievements

References

External links
 
 
 
 
 

1982 births
Living people
Athletes from Saint Petersburg
Estonian decathletes
Olympic athletes of Estonia
Athletes (track and field) at the 2008 Summer Olympics
World Athletics Championships athletes for Estonia